Donald Cameron (25 December 1927 – 15 September 2003) was a Scottish international rugby union player. He played as a Centre.

Rugby union career

Amateur career

Cameron played for Glasgow HSFP.

Provincial career

Cameron played for Glasgow District. He played in the Scottish Inter-District Championship in its first season, 1953–54.

International career

He was capped for  six times between 1953 and 1954.

Family

His brother Angus Cameron was also capped for Scotland.

References

Sources

 Bath, Richard (ed.) The Scotland Rugby Miscellany (Vision Sports Publishing Ltd, 2007 )

1927 births
2003 deaths
Scottish rugby union players
Scotland international rugby union players
Rugby union players from Glasgow
Glasgow HSFP players
Glasgow District (rugby union) players
Rugby union centres